Dicranum is a genus of mosses, also called wind-blown mosses or fork mosses. 
These mosses form in densely packed clumps. Stems may fork, but do not branch. In general, upright stems will be single but packed together. Dicranum is distributed globally. In North America these are commonly found in Jack pine or Red pine stands.

List of Dicranum species

The genus Dicranum contains the following species according to World Flora Online:

Dicranum acanthoneurum 
Dicranum acuminatum 
Dicranum acutifolium 
Dicranum adianthoides 
Dicranum africanum 
Dicranum alpinum 
Dicranum amoenevirens 
Dicranum angustinerve 
Dicranum antarcticum 
Dicranum arcuatipes 
Dicranum arcuatum 
Dicranum areodictyon 
Dicranum arfakianum 
Dicranum argyrocaulon 
Dicranum armitii 
Dicranum asplenioides 
Dicranum assamicum 
Dicranum atratum 
Dicranum aulacocarpum 
Dicranum aureonitens 
Dicranum australe 
Dicranum austrinum 
Dicranum austro-alpinum 
Dicranum austro-congestum 
Dicranum austro-scoparium 
Dicranum baileyanum 
Dicranum bardunovii 
Dicranum bartramianum 
Dicranum bartramioides 
Dicranum bauerae 
Dicranum berteroanum 
Dicranum beyrichianum 
Dicranum bicolor 
Dicranum billardierei 
Dicranum bipartitum 
Dicranum boivinianum 
Dicranum bonjeanii  – crisped fork-moss
Dicranum borbonicum 
Dicranum brachysteleum 
Dicranum brasiliense 
Dicranum braunsiae 
Dicranum brevifolium 
Dicranum brevipilum 
Dicranum brunneum 
Dicranum bruntonii 
Dicranum bryoides 
Dicranum caesium 
Dicranum callistomum 
Dicranum calycinum 
Dicranum cambouei 
Dicranum campylophyllum 
Dicranum canariense 
Dicranum capillaceum 
Dicranum capillatus 
Dicranum cheoi 
Dicranum chilense 
Dicranum chloropus 
Dicranum circinatum 
Dicranum cirratum 
Dicranum clathratum 
Dicranum clavatum 
Dicranum columbiae 
Dicranum comosum 
Dicranum conanenum 
Dicranum condensatum 
Dicranum confine 
Dicranum conglomeratum 
Dicranum corniculatum 
Dicranum crassifolium 
Dicranum crispatulum 
Dicranum crispifolium 
Dicranum crispulum 
Dicranum cruegeri 
Dicranum cruegerianum 
Dicranum cryptodon 
Dicranum cuneifolium 
Dicranum curtum 
Dicranum cutlackii 
Dicranum cygneum 
Dicranum cylindricum 
Dicranum daymannianum 
Dicranum decumbens 
Dicranum deflexicaulon 
Dicranum delavayi 
Dicranum densicoma 
Dicranum densifolium 
Dicranum densum 
Dicranum deplanchei 
Dicranum dichelymoides 
Dicranum dicnemoides 
Dicranum dicranellatum 
Dicranum didymodon 
Dicranum dilatinerve 
Dicranum diminutum 
Dicranum diplospiniferum 
Dicranum dispersum 
Dicranum drepanocladium 
Dicranum drummondii 
Dicranum dubium 
Dicranum ecaudatum 
Dicranum edentulum 
Dicranum eggersianum 
Dicranum eggersii 
Dicranum elegans 
Dicranum ellipticum 
Dicranum elongatum  – dense fork-moss
Dicranum eucamptodontoides 
Dicranum euchlorum 
Dicranum exaltatum 
Dicranum exasperatum 
Dicranum fagimontanum 
Dicranum fallax 
Dicranum fasciculatum 
Dicranum fastigiatum 
Dicranum filifolium 
Dicranum filum 
Dicranum flagellare  – whip fork-moss
Dicranum flavescens 
Dicranum flavidum 
Dicranum fragilifolium 
Dicranum fragillimum 
Dicranum frigidum 
Dicranum fulvum 
Dicranum fuscescens  – dusky fork-moss
Dicranum gardneri 
Dicranum gayanum 
Dicranum geluense 
Dicranum gemmatum 
Dicranum gonoi 
Dicranum gregoryi 
Dicranum grevilleanum 
Dicranum grimmioides 
Dicranum griseum 
Dicranum groenlandicum 
Dicranum guilleminianum 
Dicranum gymnostomum 
Dicranum hamulosum 
Dicranum hariotii 
Dicranum hildebrandtii 
Dicranum himalayanum 
Dicranum hispidulum 
Dicranum hokinense 
Dicranum homalobolax 
Dicranum homannii 
Dicranum homomallum 
Dicranum howellii 
Dicranum incrassatum 
Dicranum integerrimum 
Dicranum itacolumitis 
Dicranum japonicum 
Dicranum jashii 
Dicranum johannis-meyeri 
Dicranum johnstonii 
Dicranum kashmirense 
Dicranum kerguelense 
Dicranum klauteri 
Dicranum kwangtungense 
Dicranum laeve 
Dicranum lamellatum 
Dicranum lamellinerve 
Dicranum leiodontium 
Dicranum leioneuron  – fuzzy fork-moss
Dicranum leucobryoides 
Dicranum liebmannii 
Dicranum linzianum 
Dicranum longicolle 
Dicranum longicylindricum 
Dicranum longipilum 
Dicranum longirostratum 
Dicranum longirostre 
Dicranum lophoneuron 
Dicranum lorifolium 
Dicranum mackayi 
Dicranum maedae 
Dicranum majus  – greater fork-moss
Dicranum mamillosum 
Dicranum martianum 
Dicranum mayrii 
Dicranum menziesii 
Dicranum mittenii 
Dicranum montanum  – mountain fork-moss
Dicranum muehlenbeckii 
Dicranum myosuroides 
Dicranum nanum 
Dicranum nelsonii 
Dicranum nepalense 
Dicranum nigricans 
Dicranum nipponense 
Dicranum nitidum 
Dicranum nivale 
Dicranum novaustrinum 
Dicranum obliquatum 
Dicranum ontariense 
Dicranum orientale 
Dicranum orthophylloides 
Dicranum orthophyllum 
Dicranum osmundoides 
Dicranum otii 
Dicranum pachyneuron 
Dicranum pacificum 
Dicranum pallescens 
Dicranum pallidisetum 
Dicranum pallidum 
Dicranum palmatum 
Dicranum pancheri 
Dicranum papillidens 
Dicranum paramicola 
Dicranum patens 
Dicranum pauperum 
Dicranum perexile 
Dicranum perhorridum 
Dicranum perichaetiale 
Dicranum perlongifolium 
Dicranum perrottetii 
Dicranum peruvianum 
Dicranum petrophylum 
Dicranum pinetorum 
Dicranum planinervium 
Dicranum platyloma 
Dicranum plurisetum 
Dicranum polycarpum 
Dicranum polychaetum 
Dicranum polypodioides 
Dicranum polysetum  – rugose fork-moss
Dicranum psathyrum 
Dicranum pseudacutifolium 
Dicranum pseudofalcatum 
Dicranum pseudojulaceum 
Dicranum pseudoleucoloma 
Dicranum pseudorobustum 
Dicranum pterotoneuron 
Dicranum pulvinatum 
Dicranum punctulatum 
Dicranum pungentella 
Dicranum ramosum 
Dicranum rectifolium 
Dicranum recurvatum 
Dicranum recurvum 
Dicranum reflexisetum 
Dicranum reflexum 
Dicranum rhabdocarpum 
Dicranum richardii 
Dicranum richardsoni 
Dicranum rigidum 
Dicranum robustum 
Dicranum rodriguezii 
Dicranum rogeri 
Dicranum rufescens 
Dicranum rugifolium 
Dicranum rupestre 
Dicranum rutenbergii 
Dicranum sanctum 
Dicranum savannarum 
Dicranum savatieri 
Dicranum saxatile 
Dicranum schensianum 
Dicranum schistioides 
Dicranum schwaneckeanum 
Dicranum sciuroides 
Dicranum scopareolum 
Dicranum scoparium  – broom fork-moss
Dicranum scopellifolium 
Dicranum scottianum  – Scott's fork-moss
Dicranum seligeri 
Dicranum semicompletum 
Dicranum septentrionale 
Dicranum serrulatum 
Dicranum setifolium 
Dicranum setschwanicum 
Dicranum smaragdinum 
Dicranum sordidum 
Dicranum spadiceum 
Dicranum speirophyllum 
Dicranum splachnoides 
Dicranum spurium  – rusty fork-moss
Dicranum squarrosulum 
Dicranum stellatum 
Dicranum stenocarpum 
Dicranum striatulum 
Dicranum strictum 
Dicranum strumiferum 
Dicranum stuhlmannii 
Dicranum stygium 
Dicranum subbasilare 
Dicranum subconfine 
Dicranum subluteum 
Dicranum subporodictyon 
Dicranum suecicum 
Dicranum sullivanii 
Dicranum sumichrastii 
Dicranum surinamense 
Dicranum symblepharoides 
Dicranum syrrhopodontoides 
Dicranum tapes 
Dicranum tauricum  – fragile fork-moss
Dicranum taxifolium 
Dicranum tectorum 
Dicranum tenerum 
Dicranum tenuifolium 
Dicranum terebrifolium 
Dicranum thelinotum 
Dicranum thraustophyllum 
Dicranum thwaitesii 
Dicranum toninii 
Dicranum torfaceum 
Dicranum torquatum 
Dicranum tortifolium 
Dicranum trachyblepharon 
Dicranum transsylvanicum 
Dicranum trichopodum 
Dicranum triforme 
Dicranum triviale 
Dicranum truncatum 
Dicranum truncicola 
Dicranum tubulifolium 
Dicranum undulatifolium 
Dicranum undulatum 
Dicranum vaginatum 
Dicranum viride 
Dicranum viridissimum 
Dicranum wallisii 
Dicranum weymouthii 
Dicranum widgrenii 
Dicranum yezomontanum 
Dicranum zygodonticarpum

References

External links

Dicranales
Bryophyta of North America
Moss genera